Poetry London is a literary periodical based in London. Published three times a year, it features poems, reviews, and other articles.

Profile
Adopting the title of an earlier bimonthly publication which ran from 1939 to 1951, Poetry London was founded in 1988 as a listings magazine. It now publishes poems from Britain and around the world, some originally written in English and some in English translation.

The current head of the editorial team is André Naffis-Sahely. Previous poetry editors have included Colette Bryce, Pascale Petit, Maurice Riordan, Ahren Warner and Martha Sprackland.

The Poetry London Prize

The magazine runs a major international poetry competition each year, in which the winner receives the Poetry London Prize for a single outstanding poem. There are also second and third prizes. All entries are single poems written in English that have not have yet been published. The first prize is currently £5000. Winners have included Liz Berry, Richard Scott, and Romalyn Ante.

Contributors
Contributors have included some of the best-known poets writing in the English language. But the magazine operates an open submissions policy, and every issue carries both established and emerging poets.

Each issue also has a cover portrait of one of the poets whose work it features. Past cover poets have included Fred D'Aguiar, Carol Ann Duffy, Philip Gross, Helen Farish and Julia Copus.

References

External links
Poetry London site
Poetry London issues available online
Finding aid to the Poetry London-New York records at Columbia University. Rare Book & Manuscript Library.

Literary magazines published in the United Kingdom
Magazines published in London
Magazines established in 1988
Poetry magazines published in the United Kingdom
Triannual magazines published in the United Kingdom